Belhurst Castle is a former private residence on the shores of Seneca Lake in Geneva, New York, United States. It was designed by architects Fuller & Wheeler and built between 1885 and 1889. The three-story, nine bay wide Romanesque Revival style mansion is constructed of Medina sandstone. It has a slate gable roof, one-story solarium, and four rectangular stone chimneys. It features projecting porches, bays, towers with conical and pyramidal roofs, eyebrow windows, and a porte cochere with Syrian arch.

It was listed on the National Register of Historic Places in 1987.

Supplemented by modern facilities, Belhurst Castle has been adapted for hotel and retail uses. It holds a hotel with three choices of lodging (Vinifera Inn, Chambers in the Castle, and White Springs Manor); two ballrooms to host weddings, two restaurants (Edgar's Restaurant and Stonecutters); spa, and a winery.

Belhurst Castle has previously been used as a speakeasy during Prohibition, casino, and supper club. Edgar's restaurant is a formal dining restaurant (but it does not enforce a dress code); it is open for breakfast, lunch, and dinner. Stonecutters is more eclectic and a more relaxing atmosphere.

References

 Sakmyster, David. The Belhurst Story. New York: iUniverse, 2003.

Houses on the National Register of Historic Places in New York (state)
Romanesque Revival architecture in New York (state)
Houses completed in 1888
Houses in Ontario County, New York
Tourist attractions in Ontario County, New York
Geneva, New York
National Register of Historic Places in Ontario County, New York